John George McAtee (born 23 July 1999) is an English footballer who plays as a striker for EFL League Two  side Grimsby Town, on loan from EFL Championship side Luton Town.

He has previously played for Shrewsbury Town where he began his career, taking in loan spells with Halesowen Town, AFC Telford United, Ashton United and Curzon Ashton. He joined Scunthorpe United in 2019 where he remained for several seasons before joining Grimsby in the summer of 2021.

Club career

Shrewsbury Town
McAtee made his first appearance for the Shrewsbury Town first-team ahead of his second year as a scholar, in a pre-season friendly away at Stourbridge in July 2016. He made his English Football League debut as an 84th-minute substitute for Ryan Yates in a 2–0 loss at Oxford United on the final day of the 2016–17 season, and subsequently signed a one-year professional contract, committing him to the club until summer 2018.

McAtee joined Halesowen Town on an initial one-month youth loan on 30 September 2017. This was later extended until Christmas 2017, with "Yeltz" manager John Hill eager to extend it further again, however he returned to his parent club, before being loaned out to National League North club AFC Telford United in February 2018.

On 4 August 2018, McAtee joined National League North side Ashton United on a one-month loan deal. Afterwards, on 26 September, McAtee was loaned out again for the rest of the season, back to Telford. However, on 21 December, he was loaned for a month to Curzon Ashton, again of the same league. The deal was later extended for the rest of the season. He was released by Shrewsbury in May 2019.

Scunthorpe United
On 8 July 2019, McAtee signed for League Two side Scunthorpe United.

He scored his first league goal for the club on 18 January 2020, an equaliser in a 2–2 draw away at Bradford City.

Grimsby Town
On 8 June 2021, McAtee turned down a new contract with Scunthorpe to join local rivals Grimsby Town on a two-year deal, reuniting him with manager Paul Hurst for a third time. it is understood that Grimsby would have to pay a compensation fee for the player. 

McAtee scored on his Mariners debut in a 1–0 win over Weymouth on 28 August 2021. McAtee was awarded both the "Player of the Year" and the "Young Player of the Year" awards following on from his first season with Grimsby.

McAtee scored Grimsby's first goal in a 5–4 away victory over Wrexham in the National League play off semi-final.  He also scored the first goal in the 2–1 victory over Solihull Moors in the 2022 National League play-off Final to send Grimsby back to the Football League.

Luton Town
On 2 August 2022, McAtee signed for EFL Championship club Luton Town for an undisclosed fee, returning to Grimsby Town on loan until the end of the 2022–23 season in order to continue his development.

McAtee suffered a shoulder injury following the opening day of the season, initially dislocating it against Leyton Orient which would end up needing surgery.

On 1 November 2022, McAtee played his first football in months as he scored twice for Luton's development side in a 3–3 friendly with Stevenage.

Personal life
McAtee is the older brother of Manchester City midfielder James McAtee. Their father, paternal grandfather and great-uncles played rugby league professionally, and the football players and managers Alan Ball Sr. and Alan Ball Jr. are their maternal great-grandfather and great-uncle respectively.

Career statistics

Honours
Grimsby Town
National League play-off winners: 2022

Individual
Grimsby Town Player of the Year: 2021–22.
Grimsby Town Young Player of the Year: 2021–22.

References 

1999 births
Living people
Footballers from Salford
AFC Telford United players
Association football forwards
English Football League players
English footballers
Halesowen Town F.C. players
Shrewsbury Town F.C. players
Ashton United F.C. players
Curzon Ashton F.C. players
Scunthorpe United F.C. players
Grimsby Town F.C. players
Luton Town F.C. players
National League (English football) players
Northern Premier League players